This is a list of ancient tribes in Thrace and Dacia including possibly or partly Thracian or Dacian tribes, and non-Thracian or non-Dacian tribes that inhabited the lands known as Thrace and Dacia. A great number of Ancient Greek tribes lived in these regions as well, albeit in the Greek colonies.

Tribes

Thracian
Certain tribes and subdivisions of tribes were named differently by ancient writers but modern research points out that these were in fact the same tribe. The name Thracians itself seems to be a Greek exonym and we have no way of knowing what the Thracians called themselves. Also certain tribes mentioned by Homer are not indeed historical.
Agrianes
Apsynthii
Astae, they appear in the 2nd century BC to 1st century BC
Beni
Bessi
Bisaltae
Bistones
Bithyni or Bythini, migrated to Asia minor
Brenae
Crousi
Cebrenii
Coelaletae
Dersaei
Edones
Dentheletae
Derrones
Digeri
Dii
Diobesi
Dolonci
Kainoi
Kikones, mentioned by Homer in Odyssey
Coreli
Corpili
Krestones
Krobyzoi, perhaps Getae
Maduateni
Maedi
MaedoBythini, Maedi that migrated to Asia minor
Melanditae
Melinophagi
Nipsaei
Odomanti
Odrysae
Paeti
Pieres
Sapaei, close to Abdera, ruled Thrace after the Odrysians
Satri Satrae
Sycaeboae
Scyrmiadae
Sintians
Sithones
Thyni, migrated to Asia minor
Tilataei
Tralles
Tranipsae
Trausi
Treres
Triballi

Geto-Dacian

Aedi
Albocenses
Anarti
Apuli (Appuli), with the center at Apulon
Biephi
Biessoi were a Dacian tribe, among the enemies of the Romans in the Marcomannic Wars (166-180 AD), according to Julius Capitolinus"
Buredeenses
Buri, their capital was Buridava
Carpi
Caucoenses or Cauci
Ciaginsi
Clariae
Coertoboci also Koistobokoi and Koistobokoi Montanoi
Crobidae,
Daci
Getae
Napae, Dacianized Scythian tribe, after whom the city of Napoca is possibly named
Osi were a Dacian tribe  but it is also argued that it was Germanic or Celtic. It was among the enemies of the Romans in the Marcomannic Wars (166-180 AD), according to Julius Capitolinus"
Piephigi
Potulatenses
Predasenses
Rhadacenses
Sabokoi were a Dacian tribe, among the enemies of the Romans in the Marcomannic Wars (166-180 AD), according to Julius Capitolinus"
Saldenses
Scaugdae
Sense
Suci
Terici
Teurisci
Trixae
Tyrageti
Troglodytae

Daco-Thracian
Artakioi
Moesi

Thraco-Illyrian
Dardani
Galabri, subtribe of the Dardani.
Thunatae, subtribe of the Dardani.

Illyrian
Baridustae
Breuci part of this tribe was settled in Dacia
Pannonian tribes part of these many tribes were settled in Dacia
Pirustae
Sardeates

Paeonian

 See: List of Paeonian tribes

Greek
 See Greek colonies in Thrace

Phrygian
Bryges
Mygdones
Phrygians

Celtic and Germanic
Anartoi, Celts assimilated by Dacians
Bastarnae Celts or Germanics and according to Livy "the bravest nation on earth"
Boii
Carpi
Costoboci
Eravisci
Gauls of Tylis
Peukini
Scordisci
Serdi
Teuriscii, Celts assimilated by Dacians
Cotense, a Celtic tribe

Thracian/Scythian
Agathyrsi

See also 
 List of ancient Geto-Dacian, Moesian, Thracian and Paeonian tribes
 List of ancient Illyrian, Dalmatian, Pannonian and Dardanian tribes
 List of ancient tribes in Illyria
 List of ancient cities in Thrace and Dacia
 List of ancient cities in Illyria
 List of rulers of Dacia
 List of rulers of Thrace
 List of rulers of Illyria

References

External links 

 
 
Balkans-related lists
Thracian tribes
Thracian tribes

ro:Listă de neamuri şi triburi tracice